Francisco Hermenegildo Tomás Garcés   (April 12, 1738 – July 18, 1781) was a Spanish Franciscan friar who served as a missionary and explorer in the colonial Viceroyalty of New Spain. He explored much of the southwestern region of North America, including present day Sonora and Baja California in Mexico, and the U.S. states of Arizona and California.
He was killed along with his companion friars during an uprising by the Native American population, and they have been declared martyrs for the faith by the Catholic Church. The cause for his canonization was opened by the Church.

History
Garcés was born April 12, 1738, in Morata de Jalón, Aragon, north-central Spain. He entered the Franciscan Order about 1758 and was ordained a priest in 1763 in Spain.

New Spain

Garcés travelled to New Spain (Mexico) and served at the Franciscan college of Santa Cruz in Querétaro. In 1768, when the King of Spain expelled the Jesuits from their extensive mission system in northwestern New Spain (within present-day Baja California, northwestern Mexico, and the southwestern United States), Garcés was among the Franciscan replacements. He was assigned to Mission San Xavier del Bac in the Sonoran Desert, near present-day Tucson, Arizona.

Missionary
The expulsion of the Jesuits by the Spanish King set in motion a sequence of dramatic events in the missions. The Franciscans from the college of Santa Cruz in  Querétaro took over responsibility in the Sonoran Desert missions region in the present-day Mexican state of Sonora and the U.S. state of Arizona. Meanwhile, other Franciscans from the college of San Fernando in Mexico City under the leadership of Junípero Serra, were assigned to replace the Jesuits in the Baja California missions of the lower Las Californias Province.

Explorer

Garcés became a key player in this effort, conducting extensive explorations in the Sonoran, Colorado, and Mojave Deserts, the Gila River, and the Colorado River from the Gulf of California and Lower Colorado River Valley to the Grand Canyon. He encountered and recorded accounts of the Native American tribes in their desert and riparian valley homelands, and established peaceable relations for the Crown, including with the Quechan, Mojave, Hopi, and Havasupai. Many journeys were explorations on his own in the deserts. He accompanied soldier-explorer Juan Bautista de Anza part way in both his large overland expeditions: the 1774 De Anza Expedition - first to reach Alta California's Pacific coast from the east; and the 1775-76 Anza Colonizing Expedition, which traveled as far north as San Francisco Bay. Garcés also crossed the Mojave Desert on the Mohave Trail and then the Old Tejon Pass and explored the southern San Joaquin Valley in 1776.  The eastern part of the route Garcés took from the Colorado River across the Mojave Desert is known to four-wheel-drive adventurers today as the Mojave Road.

Death
In 1779–81 Garcés and Juan Díaz established two mission churches (Mission Puerto de Purísima Concepción and Mission San Pedro y San Pablo de Bicuñer) on the lower Colorado River at Yuma Crossing, as part of a new pueblo (secular settlement), in the homeland of the Quechan peoples (Yuma or Kwítsaín).  Garcés tried to keep peace between all parties. The formerly peaceful rapport with the Quechan was lost due to Spanish settlers allegedly violating the treaty with the native peoples, resulting in the losses of crops and farmlands. In July 1781, Garcés, Díaz and their fellow friars were among those killed in a violent uprising at the Mission San Pedro y San Pablo de Bicuñer, known as the Yuma Uprising and Yuma Revolt.

Garcés' body was later reinterred at Mission San Pedro y San Pablo del Tubutama. He and the other friars killed at those missions are considered martyrs by the Catholic Church.

Legacy

El Garces Hotel
The El Garces Hotel, named in Francisco Garcés' honor, is the historic 1908 Santa Fe Railroad station and Harvey House hotel 'oasis' located in the City of Needles. It is located in eastern California above the Colorado River, a site Garcés passed through during the 1776 Anza expedition. The El Garces Hotel was built by the Santa Fe Railroad under contract with the Fred Harvey Company. It is designed in an elegant Neoclassical and Beaux-Arts style, and the El Garces was considered the "Crown Jewel" of the entire Fred Harvey chain.

National Forest
The name was discontinued in 1911 when it was combined with Coronado National Forest.

Bakersfield
The first Tejon Pass (original) between the Mojave Desert (and New Spain) over the Tehachapi Mountains to the southern San Joaquin Valley floor (future site of Bakersfield), California, had been discovered by Garcés in 1776, eastward from the Anza Colonizing Expedition route. Therefore, there are several landmarks for Francisco Garcés in Bakersfield, California: Garces Memorial High School, the city's Catholic high school; and on Chester Avenue Garces Memorial Circle, with a memorial statue of Garcés.

Las Vegas, Nevada 
The original platted east–west streets of the 1905 Las Vegas Township are all named for significant North American explorers, beginning with Stewart on the north, then Ogden, Fremont, Carson, Bridger, Lewis, Clark, Bonneville, Gass, and finally Garces on the south.

 Reno, Nevada
St. Thomas Aquinas Cathedral has a stained glass window dedicated to Fray Garces.

See also
Spanish missions in the Sonoran Desert
Spanish missions in Baja California
 California Historical Landmarks in Kern County
California Historical Landmark

Notes

References
 Garcés, Francisco. 1900. On the Trail of a Spanish Pioneer: The Diary and Itinerary of Francisco Garcés. Edited by Elliott Coues. Two vols. Francis P. Harper, New York, NY.
 Garcés, Francisco. 1967. A Record of Travels in Arizona and California, 1775–1776. Edited by John Galvin. John Howell, San Francisco.

External links

Web de Anza: 1774 Diary of Padre Francisco Garcés — Discovery Expedition: during January - July  1774.
Web de Anza: 1776 Diary of Padre Francisco Garcés — Colonizing Expedition: during October - December 1776.
MojaveDesert.net: Francisco Garcés - "Missionary priest who led an expedition across the Mojave" - history webpage

People of New Spain
1738 births
1781 deaths
Explorers of California
Explorers of Arizona
Spanish explorers of North America
Spanish Friars Minor
18th-century Spanish Roman Catholic priests
Spanish Roman Catholic missionaries
Franciscan missionaries
Martyred Roman Catholic priests
18th-century Roman Catholic martyrs
History of Baja California
Sonora
Pre-statehood history of Arizona
Burials in Arizona
Spanish Servants of God
Priests of the Spanish missions in California
People from Valdejalón
Explorers of the United States
Explorers of Mexico
Mohave Trail
Roman Catholic missionaries in New Spain